Kentwood is an electoral ward of the Borough of Reading, in the English county of Berkshire. It consists of the northern part of the suburb of Tilehurst, in the west of Reading, south of the River Thames. The ward is bordered by Caversham Heights and Battle wards to the east, and Norcot and Tilehurst wards to the south. To the west the ward is bordered by the reduced civil parish of Tilehurst in the district of West Berkshire which is the remainder of the larger ancient parish, before the expansion of the Borough of Reading.  The ward has schools and churches bearing a Tilehurst, rather than Reading name.

As with all wards, it elects three councillors to Reading Borough Council.  Elections since 2004 are held by thirds, with elections in three years out of four.

In the 2011 the Conservative Party won followed by a Labour Party candidate each winning in 2012 and 2014.

These Councillors are currently, in order of election: Raj Singh (Con), Daya Pal Singh (Lab) and Glenn Dennis (Lab).

References

Wards of Reading
Tilehurst